San Jacinto (Spanish for "St. Hyacinth") is a city in Riverside County, California. It is located at the north end of the San Jacinto Valley, with Hemet to its south and Beaumont, California, to its north. The mountains associated with the valley are the San Jacinto Mountains. The population was 44,199 at the 2010 census. The city was founded in 1870 and incorporated on April 20, 1888, making it one of the oldest cities in Riverside County.

The city is home to Mt. San Jacinto College, a community college founded in 1965. San Jacinto will also be home to the eastern end of the Mid County Parkway, a planned route that would eventually connect it to the city of Perris. In the late 19th century and early 20th century, the city became a home to many dairies, and a center for agriculture.

San Jacinto also is home to the Soboba Casino, a gaming casino owned and operated by the Soboba Band of Luiseño Indians. The Sobobas are sovereign and self-sufficient in community affairs. They operate an Indian tribal school, the Noli Academy.

History

The Luiseño were the original inhabitants of what later would be called the San Jacinto Valley, having many villages with residents. In their own language, these people called themselves Payomkowishum (also spelled "Payomkawichum"), meaning People of the West. They are a Native American people who at the time of the first contacts with the Spanish in the sixteenth century, inhabited the coastal area of southern California, ranging fifty miles from what now is the southern part of Los Angeles County, California to the northern part of contemporary San Diego County, California, and their settlements extended inland for thirty miles.

The tribe was named Luiseño by the Spanish due to their proximity to the Mission San Luís Rey de Francia ("The Mission of Saint Louis King of France," known as the "King of the Missions"), which was founded on June 13, 1798, by Father Fermín Francisco de Lasuén, in what was the First Military District in what now is Oceanside, California, in northern San Diego County.

The Anza Trail, one of the first European overland routes to California, named after Juan Bautista de Anza,4 crossed the valley in the 1770s. Mission padres named the valley, San Jacinto, which is Spanish for Saint Hyacinth, and around 1820 they established an outpost there.

In 1842 José Antonio Estudillo received the Rancho San Jacinto Viejo Mexican land grant. In the 1860s, the Estudillo family began selling off portions of their rancho and through acquisitions, a small American community began to form. In 1868, local residents petitioned to form a school district and by 1870 a store and post office had been established. With these establishments, 1870 is considered the founding date of San Jacinto.

A plan for the community was developed in 1883 and a city government for it was incorporated on April 20, 1888, within San Diego County. San Jacinto is one of the oldest American cities in the region. In May 1893, Riverside County was created by the division of northern San Diego County and part of what now is San Bernardino County, changing the county government over San Jacinto as the new county was created.

In 1883, the San Jacinto Land Association laid out the modern city of San Jacinto at Five Points. The railroad arrived in 1888 and the city government was incorporated that same year.

The local economy was built on agriculture for many years and the city also received a boost from the many tourists who visited the nearby hot springs. The city, and its residents, helped to start the Ramona Pageant ( California's official State Outdoor Play), in 1923, and have supported the historic production ever since.

On July 15, 1937, San Jacinto was the end point for the longest uninterrupted airplane flight to that date when Mikhail Gromov's crew of three made the historic  polar flight from Moscow, USSR, in a Tupolev ANT-25. This flight followed another similar historic flight over the pole when Valery Chkalov's crew of three ended up in Vancouver's Pearson Airfield earlier that same year. With these two flights, the USSR earned two major milestones in the Fédération Aéronautique Internationale (FAI) flight records. In the early 1950s the fraternal group E Clampus Vitus and the Riverside County Department of Transportation commemorated the Gromov flight by erecting a stone marker on Cottonwood Avenue, just west of Sanderson Avenue in west-central San Jacinto. The landing site is also marked by California State Historical Landmark Number 989.

Geography

San Jacinto is located at  (33.787119, −116.966672).

The San Jacinto reservoir is an artificial lake used as a basin for the San Diego Aqueduct, a branch of the Colorado River Aqueduct, west of town.

Since local geological records have been kept, the city has been struck by two large earthquakes, one on Christmas Day in 1899, and the other on April 21, 1918.

Climate
San Jacinto has a hot-summer mediterranean climate (Köppen: Csa) hot, dry summers and cool, wet winters.

Demographics

2010
The 2010 United States Census reported that San Jacinto had a population of 44,199. The racial makeup of San Jacinto was 25,272 (57.2%) White (35.1% Non-Hispanic White), 2,928 (6.6%) African American, 812 (1.8%) Native American, 1,341 (3.0%) Asian, 124 (0.3%) Pacific Islander, 11,208 (25.4%) from other races, and 2,514 (5.7%) from two or more races. Hispanic or Latino of any race were 23,109 persons (52.3%).

The Census reported that 43,971 people (99.5% of the population) lived in households, 169 (0.4%) lived in non-institutionalized group quarters, and 59 (0.1%) were institutionalized.

There were 13,152 households, out of which 6,460 (49.1%) had children under the age of 18 living in them, 6,954 (52.9%) were opposite-sex married couples living together, 2,121 (16.1%) had a female householder with no husband present, 912 (6.9%) had a male householder with no wife present. There were 938 (7.1%) unmarried opposite-sex partnerships, and 111 (0.8%) same-sex married couples or partnerships. 2,459 households (18.7%) were made up of individuals, and 1,231 (9.4%) had someone living alone who was 65 years of age or older. The average household size was 3.34. There were 9,987 families (75.9% of all households); the average family size was 3.81.

The population was spread out, with 14,487 people (32.8%) under the age of 18, 4,404 people (10.0%) aged 18 to 24, 11,885 people (26.9%) aged 25 to 44, 8,755 people (19.8%) aged 45 to 64, and 4,668 people (10.6%) who were 65 years of age or older. The median age was 30.3 years. For every 100 females, there were 95.6 males. For every 100 females age 18 and over, there were 91.4 males.

The homeowner vacancy rate was 5.7%; the rental vacancy rate was 10.3%. 28,777 people (65.1% of the population) lived in owner-occupied housing units and 15,194 people (34.4%) lived in rental housing units.

According to the 2010 United States Census, San Jacinto had a median household income of $47,453, with 18.9% of the population living below the federal poverty line.

2000
As of the census of 2000, there were 23,779 people, 8,314 households, and 5,836 families residing in the city. The population density was 368.6/km (954.6/mi2). There were 9,476 housing units at an average density of 146.9/km (380.4/mi2). The racial makeup of the city was 69.3% White, 2.7% African American, 2.3% Native American, 1.1% Asian, 0.2% Pacific Islander, 19.5% from other races, and 4.9% from two or more races. 40.3% of the population was Hispanic or Latino of any race.

There were 8,314 households, out of which 36.1% had children under the age of 18 living with them, 52.1% were married couples living together, 13.0% had a female householder with no husband present, and 29.8% were non-families. 25.4% of all households were made up of individuals, and 14.7% har someone living alone who was 65 years of age or older. The average household size was 2.84 and the average family size was 3.41.

In the city, the population was spread out, with 31.3% under the age of 18, 8.0% from 18 to 24, 26.1% from 25 to 44, 17.3% from 45 to 64, and 17.2% who were 65 years of age or older. The median age was 34 years. For every 100 females, there were 93.8 males. For every 100 females age 18 and over, there were 89.1 males.

The median income for a household in the city was $30,627, and the median income for a family was $34,717. Males had a median income of $31,764 versus $25,392 for females. The per capita income for the city was $13,265. 20.3% of the population and 15.2% of families were below the poverty line. Out of the total population, 26.6% of those under the age of 18 and 12.2% of those 65 and older were living below the poverty line.

Government
Federal:

State:

Local:
In the Riverside County Board of Supervisors, San Jacinto is in the Third District, represented by Chuck Washington.

Tourism

San Jacinto has a memorial to veterans at Druding Park is a tribute to the men and women of the U.S. Armed Services. In the park, each branch of the military has an equipment artifact used by its members in battle, as a symbol of their services. There is a tank for the Army, a propeller for the Air Force, an anchor for the Navy, a lighthouse for the Coast Guard, and in the near future the city government hopes to add a howitzer for the Marine Corps. Various plaques and memorials also grace the  park.

The city is also home to the Estudillo Mansion, which was home to Francisco Estudillo, who was the city's first postmaster and was elected as the city's second mayor. The mansion also has a twin mansion built by Estudillo's brother, Jose Antonio Estudillo, Jr. The two mansions and the grounds are all that remains of the original  Mexican land grant given to the brother's father, Jose Antonio Estudillo in 1842. The mansion was placed on the National Register of Historic Places and on the California Register of Historic Resources. This is only the third Riverside County site to receive this honor. Francisco lost his mansion to foreclosure in 1901, but even though Jose, his brother, died in the same year, his family retained his mansion and property, including the olive grove, and it was considered the Estudillo Estate, becoming the site of many family events, and a couple of family burials, until it was sold in 1919. Seven years later, Adelaide, Jose's wife died in Riverside.

Services

Public safety

Police
The city is served by the Riverside County Sheriff's Department.

Fire
The city of San Jacinto contracts for fire and paramedic services with the Riverside County Fire Department through a cooperative agreement with CAL FIRE. Fire Station 25 is also a CAL FIRE fire station which has a wildland fire engine.

Education
The city is served by the San Jacinto Unified School District, made up of 12 schools. There is one comprehensive high school, San Jacinto High School (San Jacinto, California), and a continuation high school, Mountain View High School. There are 7 elementary schools and 3 middle schools in the city, and one independent studies program on the Mountain View High School campus site. A 6–12 magnet school, San Jacinto Leadership Academy, operates on the past Monte Vista Middle School campus, serving nearly 600 children.

The San Jacinto Valley Academy is a K–12 charter school. This school is IB (International Baccalaureate) accredited.

Cemetery
The San Jacinto Valley Cemetery District maintains the San Jacinto Valley Cemetery in the city. Notable burials include Danish cartoonist Henning Dahl Mikkelsen who created the strip Ferd'nand.

Arts
The Diamond Valley Arts Council (DVAC) maintains an arts complex called the Esplanade Arts Center (EAC), which features an art gallery, community arts classes, and a performance space home to the Inland Stage Company (ISC).

Sports

Mt. San Jacinto College (the Eagles) has a sports stadium for college football and a gymnasium for college basketball, along with a ball park for a collegiate baseball team the Diamond Valley Sabers of the SCCBL (Southern California Baseball League) who also play home games in the Diamond Valley Field in Hemet.

The So Cal Coyotes of the DFI (Developmental Football International) plays half their home games in the Soboba Casino Oaks Sports Complex and their home field in Rancho Mirage in 2013, but the team has moved their home field to Shadow Hills Stadium in Indio in 2018.

The Soboba Casino's sports complex also has an indoor sports facility for boxing events held in the Soboba Indian Reservation.

See also
 Gold Base – the Church of Scientology international headquarters, located nearby

References

External links

 
 San Jacinto Museum

 
Cities in Riverside County, California
Incorporated cities and towns in California
1870 establishments in California
1888 establishments in California
Populated places established in 1888